Figure skating at the 1932 Winter Olympics took place at the Olympic Center Arena in Lake Placid, New York. Three figure skating events were contested: men's singles, ladies' singles, and pair skating. The competitions were held from Monday, 8 February to Friday, 12 February 1932. It was the first time the events were held indoors.

Medal summary

Medalists

Medal table

Participating nations
Two figure skaters competed in both the singles and the pairs event.

A total of 39 figure skaters (18 men and 21 ladies) from 13 nations (men from ten nations and ladies from nine nations) competed at the Lake Placid Games:

  (men 1, women 1)
  (men 0, women 1)
  (men 2, women 4)
  (men 1, women 0)
  (men 1, women 0)
  (men 1, women 1)
  (men 1, women 0)
  (men 0, women 4)
  (men 2, women 2)
  (men 2, women 0)
  (men 0, women 1)
  (men 1, women 1)
  (men 6, women 6)

References

External links
 International Olympic Committee results database

 
1932 Winter Olympics events
1932
1932 in figure skating
International figure skating competitions hosted by the United States